Bernardia trelawniensis is a species of flowering plant in the euphorb family, Euphorbiaceae. It is endemic to the  Cockpit Country of Jamaica. The authors of a 2008 publication reclassified the species as Critically Endangered according to the IUCN guidelines.

References

Acalyphoideae
Endangered plants
Endemic flora of Jamaica
Taxonomy articles created by Polbot